iQuarter, originally known as the Hancock & Lant Tower, is a 52-metre apartment block in Sheffield, England, completed in 2008. It is named after, and was built in lieu of, the Hancock and Lant furniture company formerly occupying the site.

Buildings and structures in Sheffield